Shwegyin Nikāya (also spelt Shwekyin Nikāya) is the second largest monastic order of monks in Burma. It is one of nine legally sanctioned monastic orders (nikāya) in the country, under the 1990 Law Concerning Sangha Organizations. Shwegyin Nikaya is a more orthodox order than Sudhammā Nikāya, with respect to adherence to the Vinaya, and its leadership is more centralized and hierarchical. The head of the Shwegyin Nikaya is called the Sangha Sammuti, whose authority on doctrine and religious practice is considered absolute.

Statistics

According to 2016 statistics published by the State Sangha Maha Nayaka Committee, 50,692 monks belonged to this monastic order, representing 9.47% of all monks in the country, making it the second largest order after Sudhammā. With respect to geographic representation, the plurality of Shwegyin monks live in Yangon Region (23.66%), followed by Sagaing Region (17.47%), Bago Region (16.58%), and Mandalay Region (13.98%).

History
The monastic order was founded in the mid-nineteenth century by a chief abbot monk in the village of Shwegyin (translated into english as Gold or suvaṇṇa into Pāḷi); hence, its name. It formally separated from the Sudhammā Nikāya during the reign of King Mindon Min, and attempts to reconcile the two sects by the last king of Burma, Thibaw Min, were unsuccessful.

Monks of the order did not participate in the nationalist and anti-colonial movement in British Burma of the early 1900s. In the 1960s, with the ascent of Ne Win to power, the order gained monastic influence in the country, as Ne Win sought counsel from a monk at the Mahagandayon Monastery, a Shwegyin monastery in Amarapura. During the 2021 Myanmar protests, the order urged Senior General Min Aung Hlaing to immediately cease the assaults on unarmed civilians and to refrain from engaging in theft and property destruction. Its leading monks reminded the senior general to be a good Buddhist, which entailed keeping to the Five Precepts required for at least a human rebirth.

Notes

References

See also
Sudhammā Nikāya
Hngettwin Nikaya
Dwara Nikaya
Nikāya
Buddhism in Burma

Theravada Buddhist orders
Schools of Buddhism founded in Myanmar